Leonardo Marchesi (died 1513) was a Roman Catholic prelate who served as Bishop of Albenga (1476–1513).

Biography
On 5 Oct 1476, Leonardo Marchesi was appointed during the papacy of Pope Sixtus IV as Bishop of Albenga.
He served as Bishop of Albenga until his death on 31 Jul 1513.

References

External links and additional sources
 (for Chronology of Bishops)
 (for Chronology of Bishops)

15th-century Italian Roman Catholic bishops
16th-century Italian Roman Catholic bishops
Bishops appointed by Pope Sixtus IV
1513 deaths